Pledge may refer to:

Promises 
 a solemn promise
 Abstinence pledge, a commitment to practice abstinence, usually teetotalism or chastity
 The Pledge (New Hampshire), a promise about taxes by New Hampshire politicians
 Pledge of Allegiance (disambiguation), several uses

Arts and entertainment

Music 
 Pledge (album), by Killer Mike, 2011
 Pledge: A Tribute to Kerbdog, a 2010 album by Kerbdog
 "Pledge" (song), by The Gazette, 2010
 "Pledge", a prelude to Janet Jackson's 1989 song "Rhythm Nation"
 "The Pledge (Remix)", a song on the 2002 album The Last Temptation by Ja Rule
 Die Bürgschaft ('The Pledge'), a 1799 ballad by Friedrich Schiller 
 Die Bürgschaft (opera), by Kurt Weill, 1932

Other uses in arts and entertainment 
 The Pledge (play), an 1831 play by James Kenney
 The Pledge: Requiem for the Detective Novel, a 1958 novella by Friedrich Dürrenmatt
 The Pledge (film), a 2001 American mystery directed by Sean Penn
 The Pledge, the working title of A Gunfighter's Pledge, a 2008 TV Western 
 The Pledge (British TV programme), 2016-2020
 Pledge (film), a 2018 American horror film

Ships 
 , a minesweeper commissioned in 1944
 , a minesweeper commissioned in 1956

Other uses 
 Pledge (brand), a cleaning product by S. C. Johnson & Son
 Pledge (law), a type of legal relationship
 a prospective member of a fraternity or sorority
 H.S. Pledge & Sons Ltd, a milling business
 Thomas Frederick de Pledge (1867–1954), Australian pioneer and pastoralist
 Pledge, a maze-solving algorithm

See also